Horst Lunenburg (born 18 January 1943) is a former German footballer.

Lunenburg made 63 appearances in the 2. Bundesliga during his playing career.

References

External links 
 

1943 births
Living people
German footballers
Association football forwards
2. Bundesliga players
Tennis Borussia Berlin players